1995 was the fourth season Russia held its own national football competition since the breakup of the Soviet Union.

Club competitions

FC Spartak-Alania Vladikavkaz won the league for the first time ever.

This was the first season 3 points were awarded for a win instead of two.

For more details, see:
1995 Russian Top League
1995 Russian First League
1995 Russian Second League
1995 Russian Third League

Cup competitions
The third edition of the Russian Cup, 1994–95 Russian Cup was won by FC Dynamo Moscow, who beat FC Rotor Volgograd in the finals in a shootout 8-7 after finishing extra time at 0-0.

Early stages of the 1995–96 Russian Cup were played later in the year.

European club competitions

1994–95 UEFA Champions League, 1994–95 UEFA Cup Winners' Cup and 1994–95 UEFA Cup

All the Russian participants were eliminated in 1994.

1995–96 UEFA Champions League

FC Spartak Moscow won every game in their group, qualifying for the quarterfinals.

 September 13, 1993 / Group B, Day 1 / Blackburn Rovers F.C. - FC Spartak Moscow 0-1 (Yuran ) / Blackburn, Ewood Park / Attendance: 20,390
FC Spartak Moscow: Cherchesov, Khlestov, Nikiforov, Tsymbalar, Mamedov, Yuran, Onopko (captain), Kulkov, Shmarov (Kechinov, 89), Piatnitski, Tikhonov.

 September 27, 1993 / Group B, Day 2 / FC Spartak Moscow - Legia Warszawa 2-1 (Nikiforov  Yuran  - Jóźwiak ) / Moscow, Luzhniki Stadium / Attendance: 55,000
FC Spartak Moscow: Cherchesov, Khlestov, Nikiforov, Tsymbalar, Mamedov, Yuran, Onopko (captain), Kulkov, Shmarov, Piatnitski, Tikhonov.

 October 18, 1995 / Group B, Day 3 / Rosenborg BK - FC Spartak Moscow 2-4 (Løken  Brattbakk  - Alenichev  Kechinov   Nikiforov ) / Trondheim, Lerkendal Stadion / Attendance: 40,000
FC Spartak Moscow: Cherchesov, Khlestov, Nikiforov, Tsymbalar, Mamedov, Yuran, Onopko (captain), Kulkov, Shmarov (Kechinov, 58), Piatnitski (Alenichev, 46), Tikhonov.

 November 1, 1995 / Group B, Day 4 / FC Spartak Moscow - Rosenborg BK 4-1 (Shmarov  Yuran  Tsymbalar  Tikhonov  - Løken ) / Moscow, Luzhniki Stadium / Attendance: 40,000
FC Spartak Moscow: Cherchesov, Khlestov, Nikiforov, Tsymbalar (Kechinov, 46), Ananko, Yuran, Onopko (captain), Kulkov, Shmarov, Alenichev (Titov, 85), Tikhonov.

 November 22, 1995 / Group B, Day 5 / FC Spartak Moscow - Blackburn Rovers F.C. 3-0 (Alenichev  Nikiforov  Mamedov ) / Moscow, Luzhniki Stadium / Attendance: 35,000
FC Spartak Moscow: Cherchesov, Khlestov, Nikiforov, Tsymbalar, Mamedov, Yuran (Piatnitski, 74), Onopko (captain), Kulkov, Shmarov (Kechinov, 67), Alenichev, Tikhonov (Mukhamadiev, 87).

 December 6, 1995 / Group B, Day 6 / Legia Warszawa - FC Spartak Moscow 0-1 (Mamedov ) / Warsaw, Polish Army Stadium / Attendance: 15,000
FC Spartak Moscow: Cherchesov, Khlestov, Nikiforov, Tsymbalar, Mamedov, Kechinov, Onopko (captain) (Ananko, 82), Kulkov, Shmarov, Alenichev, Tikhonov.

1995–96 UEFA Cup Winners' Cup
FC Dynamo Moscow advanced through the first two rounds, qualifying to play in the quarterfinals next spring.

 September 14, 1995 / First Round, First Leg / FC Dynamo Moscow - FC Ararat Yerevan 3-1 (Teryokhin   Safronov  - Stepanyan ) / Moscow, Dynamo Stadium / Attendance: 7,500
FC Dynamo Moscow: Smetanin (captain), Yakhimovich, Shulgin, Kolotovkin, Sabitov (Tishkov, 79), Kobelev (Grishin, 55), Samatov, Cheryshev (Safronov, 62), S. Nekrasov, Kuznetsov, Teryokhin.

 September 28, 1995 / First Round, Return Leg / FC Ararat Yerevan - FC Dynamo Moscow 0-1 (Teryokhin ) / Yerevan, Hrazdan Stadium / Attendance: 20,000
FC Dynamo Moscow: Kleimyonov, Grishin (Kobelev, 85), Kovtun, Kolotovkin, Shulgin,  Kuznetsov, Samatov, Cheryshev, S. Nekrasov (Safronov, 85), Podpaly (captain), Teryokhin.

 October 19, 1995 / Second Round, First Leg / FC Dynamo Moscow - SK Hradec Králové 1-0 (Kuznetsov ) / Moscow, Dynamo Stadium / Attendance: 4,000
FC Dynamo Moscow: Kleimyonov, Kuznetsov, Kovtun, S. Nekrasov, Shulgin,  Kobelev (Grishin, 46), Samatov, Cheryshev, Safronov, Podpaly (captain), Tishkov (Kutsenko, 78).

 November 2, 1995 / Second Round, Return Leg / SK Hradec Králové - FC Dynamo Moscow 1–0 (Kaplan ) 1-3 in shootout (Drozd  Černý  Dzubara  Holub  - Kobelev  Teryokhin  Samatov  Kovtun ) / Hradec Králové, Všesportovní Stadion / Attendance: 11,540
FC Dynamo Moscow: Smetanin, Kuznetsov, Kovtun, Kolotovkin, Yakhimovich,  Grishin, Samatov, Cheryshev (Kobelev, 120), Safronov (Tishkov, 70), Podpaly (captain), Teryokhin.

1995–96 UEFA Cup
FC Spartak-Alania Vladikavkaz and FC Lokomotiv Moscow were eliminated in the first round by strong opponents (even though Lokomotiv very unexpectedly beat FC Bayern in Munich in the first game). FC Rotor Volgograd eliminated Manchester United F.C. in the first round, but went out in the second round.

 September 12, 1995 / First Round, First Leg / FC Bayern Munich - FC Lokomotiv Moscow 0-1 (Kharlachyov ) / Munich, Olympic Stadium / Attendance: 16,000
FC Lokomotiv Moscow: Ovchinnikov, Arifullin, Drozdov, Kharlachyov, Hovhannisyan, Chugainov, Kosolapov (captain), Gurenko, Elyshev, Solomatin, Garin (Maminov, 82).
 September 12, 1995 / First Round, First Leg / FC Rotor Volgograd - Manchester United F.C. 0-0 / Volgograd, Central Stadium / Attendance: 40,000
FC Rotor Volgograd: Samorukov, Shmarko, Burlachenko, Gerashchenko (captain), Yeshchenko, Zhunenko, Korniyets, Niederhaus, Veretennikov, Yesipov, Zernov (Krivov, 80).
 September 12, 1995 / First Round, First Leg / FC Spartak-Alania Vladikavkaz - Liverpool F.C. 1-2 (Qosimov  -  McManaman  Redknapp ) / Vladikavkaz, Republican Spartak Stadium / Attendance: 43,000
FC Spartak-Alania Vladikavkaz: Khapov, Pagayev (Timofeev, 46), Gorlukovich (Kornienko, 81), Shelia, Dzhioyev (captain), Tetradze, Tedeyev, Yanovskiy, Qosimov (Derkach, 46), Kanishchev, Kavelashvili.

 September 26, 1995 / First Round, Return Leg / FC Lokomotiv Moscow - FC Bayern Munich 0-5 (Klinsmann   Herzog  Scholl  Strunz ) / Moscow, Lokomotiv Stadium / Attendance: 20,000
FC Lokomotiv Moscow: Ovchinnikov, Arifullin, Drozdov, Kharlachyov, Solomatin, Chugainov, Kosolapov (captain), Gurenko (Pashinin, 10; Maminov, 46), Elyshev, Kuznetsov, Garin.
 September 26, 1995 / First Round, Return Leg / Manchester United F.C. - FC Rotor Volgograd 2-2 (Scholes  Schmeichel  - Niederhaus  Veretennikov ) / Manchester, Old Trafford / Attendance: 29.724
FC Rotor Volgograd: Samorukov, Shmarko, Burlachenko, Berketov, Yeshchenko (Tsarenko, 70), Zhunenko, Korniyets, Niederhaus (Krivov, 79), Veretennikov (captain), Yesipov, Zernov (Ilyushin, 74).
 September 26, 1995 / First Round, Return Leg / Liverpool F.C. - FC Spartak-Alania Vladikavkaz 0-0 / Liverpool, Anfield / Attendance: 35,042
FC Spartak-Alania Vladikavkaz: Khapov, Pagayev, Kornienko (Derkach, 46), Shelia, Dzhioyev (captain), Tetradze, Tedeyev, Yanovskiy, Qosimov, Suleymanov, Kanishchev (Timofeev, 46).

 October 17, 1995 / Second Round, First Leg / FC Girondins de Bordeaux - FC Rotor Volgograd 2-1 (Histilloles  Witschge  - Niederhaus ) / Bordeaux, Parc Lescure / Attendance: 20,000
FC Rotor Volgograd: Samorukov, Shmarko, Berketov, Gerashchenko (captain), Yeshchenko, Zhunenko, Korniyets, Niederhaus (Ilyushin, 87), Veretennikov, Yesipov, Zernov (Krivov, 84).

 October 31, 1995 / Second Round, Return Leg / FC Rotor Volgograd - FC Girondins de Bordeaux 0-1 (Bancarel ) / Volgograd, Central Stadium / Attendance: 25,000
FC Rotor Volgograd: Samorukov, Shmarko, Burlachenko, Gerashchenko (captain), Yeshchenko, Berketov, Korniyets, Niederhaus, Veretennikov, Yesipov, Zernov (Ilyushin, 67).

National team
Russia national football team qualified for the UEFA Euro 1996, winning their group. Oleg Romantsev was the manager that year, with Aleksandr Tarkhanov, Boris Ignatyev and Sergei Pavlov assisting.

 March 8, 1995 / Friendly / Slovakia - Russia 2-1 (Dubovský   - Karpin  Afanasyev ) / Košice, Všešportový areál / Attendance: 10,200
Russia: Cherchesov, Gorlukovich, Nikiforov (captain), Tsymbalar (Khlestov, 30), Shalimov, Karpin, Afanasyev, Kanchelskis, Rakhimov (Kovtun, 75), Radchenko (Mostovoi, 46), Pisarev (Beschastnykh, 46).

 March 29, 1995 / UEFA Euro 1996 qualifier / Russia - Scotland 0-0 / Moscow, Luzhniki Stadium / Attendance: 37,000
Russia: Kharine, Khlestov, Nikiforov, Kovtun, Shalimov (Radimov, 68), Karpin, Onopko (captain), Kanchelskis, Dobrovolski, Radchenko (Pisarev, 58), Kiriakov.

 April 26, 1995 / UEFA Euro 1996 qualifier / Greece - Russia 0-3 (Kalitsakis  - Nikiforov  Zagorakis  Beschastnykh ) / Thessaloniki, Kaftanzoglio Stadium / Attendance: 50,000
Russia: Kharine, Kulkov, Nikiforov, Kovtun, Khlestov, Karpin, Onopko (captain), Piatnitski (Kiriakov, 46), Dobrovolski, Radchenko (Mostovoi, 75), Beschastnykh.

 May 6, 1995 / UEFA Euro 1996 qualifier / Russia - Faroe Islands 3-0 (Kechinov  Pisarev  Mukhamadiev ) / Moscow, Luzhniki Stadium / Attendance: 10,000
Russia: Cherchesov, Khlestov, Nikiforov, Kovtun, Tetradze, Kechinov, Onopko (captain), Cheryshev, Piatnitski (Lebed, 20), Pisarev, Mukhamadiev.

 May 31, 1995 / Friendly / FR Yugoslavia - Russia 1-2 (Petković  - Karpin  Beschastnykh ) / Belgrade, Stadion Crvena Zvezda / Attendance: 40,000
Russia: Kharine (Cherchesov, 46), Khlestov, Tetradze, Kovtun, Kulkov (Mamedov, 78), Karpin, Onopko (captain), Cheryshev (Afanasyev, 57), Beschastnykh, Shalimov, Kiriakov.

 June 7, 1995 / UEFA Euro 1996 qualifier / San Marino - Russia 0-7 (Dobrovolski  Kulkov  Kiriakov  Shalimov  Beschastnykh  Kolyvanov  Cheryshev ) / Serravalle, Stadio Olimpico / Attendance: 1,367
Russia: Cherchesov, Kulkov, Tetradze, Kovtun, Shalimov, Karpin, Onopko (captain), Kolyvanov, Beschastnykh, Dobrovolski (Radchenko, 59), Kiriakov (Cheryshev, 85).

 August 16, 1995 / UEFA Euro 1996 qualifier / Finland - Russia 0-6 (Kulkov   Karpin  Radchenko  Kolyvanov  ) / Helsinki, Helsinki Olympic Stadium / Attendance: 14,210
Russia: Kharine (Cherchesov, 82), Kovtun, Nikiforov, Tsymbalar, Khlestov, Onopko (captain), Kulkov, Karpin (Kanchelskis, 61), Mostovoi, Radchenko (Kiriakov, 68), Kolyvanov.

 September 6, 1995 / UEFA Euro 1996 qualifier / Faroe Islands - Russia 2:5 (H. Jarnskor  Jónsson  - Mostovoi  Kiriakov  Kolyvanov  Tsymbalar  Shalimov ) / Toftir, Svangaskarð / Attendance: 3,000
Russia: Cherchesov, Kovtun, Nikiforov, Tsymbalar, Shalimov, Kanchelskis (Beschastnykh, 57), Onopko (captain), Kulkov (Mamedov, 64), Mostovoi, Radchenko (Kiriakov, 46), Kolyvanov.

 October 11, 1995 / UEFA Euro 1996 qualifier / Russia - Greece 2-1 (Ouzounidis  Onopko  - Tsalouchidis ) / Moscow, Luzhniki Stadium / Attendance: 41,000
Russia: Kharine, Kovtun, Nikiforov, Tsymbalar (Radchenko, 62), Khlestov, Karpin (Shalimov, 75), Onopko (captain), Kulkov, Mostovoi, Yuran (Kiriakov, 46), Kolyvanov.

 November 15, 1995 / UEFA Euro 1996 qualifier / Russia - Finland 3-1 (Radchenko  Kulkov  Kiriakov  - Suominen ) / Moscow, Luzhniki Stadium / Attendance: 5,000
Russia: Cherchesov, Mamedov (Dobrovolski, 46), Nikiforov, Tsymbalar, Khlestov, Karpin (Kanchelskis, 77), Onopko (captain), Kulkov, Mostovoi, Yuran, Radchenko (Kiriakov, 63).

References

 
Seasons in Russian football